The Bamunka language, Niemeng, is a Grassfields Bantu language of Cameroon.

References

External links 

 The Bamunka Noun Phrase Information about the Bamunka language, including grammar structure

Ring languages
Languages of Cameroon